Akadia may refer to :

 Akadia, Gujarat, a village in western India
 Akadia State, a former petty Rajput princely state with seat in the above town

See also
 Acadia (disambiguation)
 Akkadian (disambiguation)